Cavalcade of Boys is a comic book miniseries by Tim Fish, featuring the lives and loves of several gay characters in America.

The characters cope with unrequited love and the search of a true lover are drawn in a stylized style.

Publishing history
Cavalcade of Boys started as a 9-issue series, published by Tim Fish between 2002 and 2004. It was then collected in three books the following year, and finally in a 550-page graphic novel in 2006.

Fish started an all-new, full-page weekly version of Cavalcade in Boston's LGBT newspaper, "Bay Windows", in summer 2007, which was ultimately compiled as the graphic novel Love is the Reason in 2008. Trust/Truth another stand-alone graphic novel featuring Cavalcade characters, was published in 2009.

A French version is also published by H&O Éditions.

References

External links
 The official site of Tim Fish
 The Gay Comics List review
 After Elton review
 The Gay League review (of the original comics)
 H&O, the French publisher

2006 graphic novels
LGBT characters in comics